Praia dos Aveiros is a small blue flag beach in the area called Areias de São João or Saint John's Sands, in the town of Albufeira, Algarve, Portugal. The beach is enclosed in a small cove and is made up of fine golden sands and is flanked at either end by cliffs and rock formations.

Description
This small beach is flanked either side by the larger and busier beaches of Praia da Oura to the east and Praia dos Alemães to the west. These beaches are separated by rocky outcrops but are linked by a coast path at the base of the cliffs but the access along these paths is not suitable for people of limited physical ability. The main foot access to the beach is by means of a footpath which is located to the side of the Hotel Auramar. The path descends down steps to the rear of the beach. There is some limited vehicular access to a small parking area but it is only for local permission holders and to people with blue badges.

Gallery

References

Beaches of Albufeira
Blue Flag beaches of Portugal